The National Shrine of Our Lady of La Leche is a Catholic Marian shrine located at the Nombre de Dios Mission in St. Augustine, Florida. Originally built in 1609 in honor of Our Lady of La Leche—a Marian apparition popular among the Spanish settlers in the area—it is the oldest shrine in the United States. It was elevated to national shrine status in 2019 and received a canonical coronation in 2021.

History

Background 
Spanish explorers, under the command of Pedro Menéndez de Avilés and the spiritual chaplaincy of Fr Francisco López de Mendoza Grajales, OFM, arrived in northern Florida in 1565. Grajalez celebrated there the first Mass in what would become the United States. The mission established there,  Nombre de Dios, was also the first in that regard.

The settlers brought with them the Spanish devotion to Nuestra Señora de La Leche y Buen Parto ("Our Lady of the Milk and Good Delivery"). The name comes from the image of the Blessed Virgin Mary nursing the infant Jesus, hence the reference to "la leche"—i.e., (breast) milk.

Construction 
The shrine was built in 1609 at the mission, in what was then Spanish Florida. The central feature of the shrine is a statue of the La Leche image. 

The original shrine was destroyed in 1728 by British invaders from the north, and was rebuilt in 1875. The chapel seats about 30 and was built in 1914.

National status and coronation 
The shrine was elevated to national shrine status by the United States Conference of Catholic Bishops (USCCB) in 2019, followed by the announcement of a canonical coronation ceremony due to take place in October 2020. 

The COVID-19 pandemic caused the rescheduling of the coronation to October 2021.

Significance 

As one of the oldest Catholic worship sites in the Americas, the shrine holds a certain historical significance and is a popular pilgrimage site for prayers concerning pregnancy. 

Upon its coronation ceremony in October 2021, it is to become just the fourth-such image in the United States.

External links 

 National Shrine of Our Lady of La Leche (official website)

References 
Roman Catholic national shrines in the United States
Roman Catholic churches completed in 1609
Shrines to the Virgin Mary
Roman Catholic churches in Florida
Churches in St. Augustine, Florida
1609 establishments in the Spanish Empire
Catholic Church in Florida
Spanish colonization of the Americas
Pre-statehood history of Florida
New Spain